Matthias of Arras (c.1290–1352), sometimes spelled as Matthew of Arras was a French architect, famed for his work on St. Vitus Cathedral in Prague.

Matthias was born in Arras, but little else is known about his early life. In 1344, he was summoned to Prague from the papal court of Avignon by Charles IV to lead works on the newly founded Saint Vitus Cathedral. He is also widely recognized as the architect of Karlstein Castle, although this fact is not fully authenticated. His involvement in the design of the New Town of Prague is also not completely certain.

When Matthias died at Prague in 1352, Saint Vitus Cathedral was not yet completed. The role of its master mason and Charles' head architect fell to then twenty-three years old Peter Parler.

Literature
 Mencl Václav: Czech Architecture of the Luxemburg Period, Artia, Prague, 1955
 České umění gotické, Prague, 1970
 V. Mencl: Poklasická gotika jižní Francie a Švábska a její vztah ke gotice české. In Umění 19, 1971, page 217.
 A. Merhautová: Katedrála sv. Víta v Praze, Prague 1994
 Y. Gallet: "Autoportrait et représentation de soi au Moyen Âge : le cas de Matthieu d’Arras à la cathédrale de Prague", In: Le Moyen Âge, t. 122-1 : Autoportrait et représentation de l’individu, 2016, p. 41-65.
 Y. Gallet: "L’escalier d’Ulrich von Ensingen à la cathédrale de Strasbourg et ses rapports avec l’œuvre de Matthieu d’Arras à la cathédrale de Prague", In: J. Chlíbec and Z. Opačić (eds.), Setkávání. Studie o středověkém umění věnované Kláře Benešovské, Prague, Artefactum / Ústav dějin umění, 2015, p. 97-109.
 Y. Gallet: "Matthieu d’Arras et l’Alsace. Les relations architecturales entre les cathédrales de Strasbourg et Prague avant Peter Parler", In: Bulletin de la cathédrale de Strasbourg, XXX, 2012, p. 19-40.

See also 
 Czech Gothic architecture

References 

1290 births
1352 deaths
14th-century French architects
14th-century Bohemian people
French Roman Catholics
Gothic architects
French expatriates in the Czech Republic
People from Arras
Burials at St. Vitus Cathedral